Mount Sinai Cemetery may refer to:

Mount Sinai Memorial Park Cemetery, California, U.S.
Mount Sinai Memorial Park (Toronto), Ontario, Canada
New Mount Sinai Cemetery, St. Louis, Missouri, U.S.

See also
Monastery of the Transfiguration's charnel house, at base of Mount Sinai, in Egypt
Mount Sinai (disambiguation)